Vello Orumets (28 June 1941 Viljandi – 26 May 2012 Tartu) was an Estonian singer.

In 1960 he graduated from Estonian SSR State Philharmonic's stage studio. From  In 1959–1962 he studied music pedagogy at the Tallinn Pedagogical Institute. From 1960 until 1977, he was a soloist for the band Laine, and 1978-1988 for the band Erfia.

In total, he recorded eight solo albums.

Songs

 "Miniseelik"
 "Rannapiiga"
 "Kui kõnnib mannekeen"
 "Las mööduvad aastad"
 "Kolm kaunist sõna"

Albums

 1982: "Vello Orumets"
 1996: "Kolm Kaunist Sõna" 
 1999: "Vello Orumets
 2000: "Valged Jõulud"
 2002: "Sõbrale"
 2009: "Igatsus on armastus"

References

1941 births
2012 deaths
20th-century Estonian male singers
Estonian pop singers
Tallinn University alumni
People from Viljandi
Burials at Metsakalmistu